Chaetovoria is a genus of flies in the family Tachinidae.

Species
Chaetovoria antennata (Villeneuve, 1920)
Chaetovoria seriata (Aldrich, 1926)

References

Diptera of South America
Diptera of Asia
Dexiinae
Tachinidae genera
Taxa named by Joseph Villeneuve de Janti